Midhurst is a market town and civil parish in Chichester District, West Sussex, England.

Midhurst may also refer to:

 Midhurst (electoral division), West Sussex, England
 Midhurst (UK electoral ward), West Sussex, England
 Midhurst (UK Parliament constituency), in existence from 1311 to 1885
 Midhurst (LSWR) railway station, open from 1864 to 1925
 Midhurst railway station, open from 1866 to 1964
 Midhurst, Ontario, Canada

See also
 Midhirst, Taranaki, New Zealand, often misspelled Midhurst